Henry E. Frye is an American judge and politician who served as the first African-American chief justice of the North Carolina Supreme Court.

Early life and education
Henry Frye was born August 1, 1932, in Ellerbe, Richmond County, North Carolina. He was 8th of 12 children, born to Walter Atlas and Pearl Motley Frye. His parents were tobacco and cotton farmers. He went to the Ellerbe Colored High School, but by accident he obtained a diploma from Ellerbe High School, the white one. After graduating with honors from North Carolina A&T State University, Frye reached the rank of captain in the United States Air Force, serving in Korea and Japan. Upon returning to North Carolina, Frye was inspired to become a lawyer when he was denied the ability to register to vote by literacy tests. He was the only African American in his law school, but despite this Frye mentions never feeling as if he was treated differently. He graduated from the University of North Carolina School of Law.

Career

Frye became an assistant U.S. Attorney in 1963, one of the first African-Americans to hold such a position in the South. Five years later, when Frye was elected to the North Carolina General Assembly as a state representative in 1968, he was the only black North Carolina legislator, and the first elected in the 20th century. No other African American had been elected to this position since 1889, which was John E. Hussey who represented the county of Craven, North Carolina. Frye helped eliminate the vestiges of Jim Crow from North Carolina law. He was re-elected several times to the state House, serving until 1980, and served one term in the state Senate from 1981 to 1982. During this time, he was also an instructor at North Carolina Central University's law school.

In 1983, Governor Jim Hunt appointed Frye to the North Carolina Supreme Court as an associate justice, the first African-American to hold that position in North Carolina history. Elected in 1984 to the court and re-elected in 1992, Jim Hunt appointed Frye to the state's highest judicial post, chief justice, in 1999 to replace the retiring Burley Mitchell. He was defeated for election to a full term in 2000 by Associate Justice I. Beverly Lake.

Frye currently practices law with Brooks, Pierce, McLendon, Humphrey & Leonard in Greensboro, North Carolina.

Awards and honors
In 2007, Frye received the North Carolina Award for public service. In 2009, he became honorary co-chairman of the U.S. Senate campaign of Kenneth Lewis. He was named chairman of the North Carolina Institute of Political Leadership in 2013.

In 2014, the General Alumni Association had awarded Frye with the Distinguished Service Medal.

In 2015 a portrait of him was dedicated to him.

In 2017 he was invited to participate at the University of North Carolina School of Law's Constitution Day celebration.

In 2018 a bridge was named in his honor.

Family
One of Frye's children, Henry Frye Jr., also became a lawyer and judge.
Frye is the uncle of professional basketball player Channing Frye.

See also
List of African-American jurists

References

External links
"Henry Frye: North Carolina's First African American Chief Justice" by Howard Covington
Biographical Conversations with Henry Frye by UNC-TV

1932 births
Living people
Democratic Party members of the North Carolina House of Representatives
Democratic Party North Carolina state senators
United States Air Force officers
North Carolina A&T State University alumni
North Carolina Central University faculty
Chief Justices of the North Carolina Supreme Court
African-American judges
People from Ellerbe, North Carolina
African-American state legislators in North Carolina
21st-century African-American people
20th-century African-American people